M426 may refer to:

M425 and 426 Tractor Truck
M426 8-inch shell